Valeriy Kutsenko (born 2 November 1986) is a retired professional Ukrainian football player and current manager.

Career
He was the top goalscorer for FC Obolon Kyiv in the 2008–09 season.

In 2020, Kutsenko joined FC Sumy, where he both acted as a player and assistant coach. In March 2021, Kutsenko was appointed manager of the club.

References

External links

1986 births
Living people
People from Kremenchuk
Association football forwards
Ukrainian footballers
Ukrainian expatriate footballers
Ukrainian expatriate sportspeople in Belarus
Ukrainian expatriate sportspeople in Latvia
Ukrainian expatriate sportspeople in Azerbaijan
Ukrainian expatriate sportspeople in Moldova
Expatriate footballers in Belarus
Expatriate footballers in Latvia
Expatriate footballers in Azerbaijan
Expatriate footballers in Moldova
Ukrainian Premier League players
Ukrainian First League players
Ukrainian Second League players
FC Dnipro-2 Dnipropetrovsk players
FC Obolon-Brovar Kyiv players
FC Obolon-2 Kyiv players
FC Kryvbas Kryvyi Rih players
FC Vorskla Poltava players
FC Dynamo Brest players
FC Minsk players
FC Daugava players
AZAL PFK players
FC Chornomorets Odesa players
MFC Mykolaiv players
Speranța Nisporeni players
Shamakhi FK players
FC Kramatorsk players
FC Sumy players
Ukrainian football managers
FC Sumy managers
Ukrainian Second League managers
Sportspeople from Poltava Oblast